Stephen Jarrod Bernard FSA FRSA FRHistS FHEA (born 1975) is an Academic Visitor at the Faculty of English Language and Literature, University of Oxford and a member of University College there. A prize-winning essayist, editor, and bibliographer, he is known mostly for his memoir about the sustained serial, clerical childhood sexual abuse in the Roman Catholic Diocese of Arundel and Brighton in the 1980s and 90s, his consequent mental illness, and the experimental psychiatric treatment he has received. In 2019 he was a Core Participant at the statutory Independent Inquiry into Child Sexual Abuse.

Career and education 
He studied English literature at Christ Church, Oxford, and Brasenose College, Oxford. In 2007, he won the international Review of English Studies essay prize for his first article in an academic journal. In 2012, he won a British Academy Postdoctoral Research Fellowship, which he held in conjunction with a Junior Research Fellowship at University College, Oxford; whilst there he wrote The Literary Correspondences of the Tonsons (Oxford: Oxford University Press, 2015), an edition based on his doctoral thesis, for which he won the international biennial MLA Morton N. Cohen Award for a Distinguished Edition of Letters (2015–17). He was general editor, textual editor, and editor of English and Latin poems of The Plays and Poems of Nicholas Rowe, five vols. (London: Pickering Masters, 2017).
In 2018, he published Paper Cuts, a memoir (London: Jonathan Cape, 2018), which revealed that he had been the victim of sustained serial, clerical sexual abuse as a child, which had caused him severe mental illness which was treated with experimental ketamine infusions. After a concerted campaign by Bernard's abuser's last surviving relative, Deidre McCormack, Canon Dermod Fogarty's headstone and memorial were destroyed with the consent of the Roman Catholic Diocese of Arundel and Brighton on 24 May 2018. The Catholic Herald published an editorial on his treatment by that Diocese and its wider implications for the Roman Catholic Church in England's response to clerical child sexual abuse as a result of this damnatio memoriae and his memoir.

Bernard specialises in the History of the Book and late 17th- and early 18th-century English literature, particularly letters and legal and financial records concerning booksellers, including, for example, The Letters of Jacob Tonson in Bodleian MS. Eng. lett., c129 (Oxford Bibliographical Society, 2019 [2020]) and ‘The Tonson publishing house and the 18th century book trade’ (The Book Collector, 2020).

Turning more fully to writers and the creation rather than production of literature, he has edited The correspondence of John Dryden, with the assistance of John McTague (Manchester University Press, 2022).

Personal life 
Bernard was diagnosed with mental illness as a result of his childhood experiences, recounted in his memoir. He resides in Oxford.

References

British memoirists
Living people
1975 births